Newberry County Airport  is a county-owned public-use airport in Newberry County, South Carolina, United States. It is located three nautical miles (6 km) north of the central business district of Newberry, South Carolina.

Although many U.S. airports use the same three-letter location identifier for the FAA and IATA, this facility is assigned EOE by the FAA but has no designation from the IATA. The airport was built in 1946 with two grass runways. The current asphalt runway was constructed in October 2008.

Facilities and aircraft 
It has one runway designated 4/22 with an asphalt surface measuring 4,000 by 75 feet (1,219 x 23 m).

For the 12-month period ending October 9, 2009, the airport had 12,100 aircraft operations, an average of 33 per day: 99% general aviation and 1% military. At that time there were 17 aircraft based at this airport: 82% single-engine, 6% multi-engine and 12% ultralight.

References

External links 
 Newberry County Airport (EOE) information from SC Division of Aeronautics
 Aerial image as of 1 March 1999 from USGS The National Map
 

Airports in South Carolina
Buildings and structures in Newberry County, South Carolina
Transportation in Newberry County, South Carolina